Mangelia gardnerae is a minute extinct species of sea snail, a marine gastropod mollusk in the family Mangeliidae.

Description

Distribution
This extinct marine species was found in Pliocene strata of Florida, USA

References

External links
 Worldwide Mollusc Species Data Base: Mangelia gardnerae

gardnerae
Gastropods described in 1930